João Duarte Teixeira Góis (born 5 May 1990 in Camacha, Madeira) is a Portuguese professional footballer who plays as a right-back for F.C. Felgueiras 1932.

References

External links

Portuguese League profile 

1990 births
Living people
Portuguese footballers
Madeiran footballers
Association football defenders
Primeira Liga players
Liga Portugal 2 players
Segunda Divisão players
C.F. União players
Sertanense F.C. players
G.D. Chaves players
F.C. Paços de Ferreira players
G.D. Estoril Praia players
F.C. Felgueiras 1932 players